John Stephen Akhwari (born 1938 in Mbulu, Tanganyika) is a Tanzanian former marathon runner. He represented Tanzania in the marathon at the 1968 Summer Olympics in Mexico City.

1968 Olympic marathon
While competing in the marathon in Mexico City, Akhwari cramped up due to the high altitude of the city.  He had not trained at such an altitude back in his country.  At the 19 kilometer point during the 42 km race, there was jockeying for position between some runners and he was hit.  He fell badly wounding his knee and dislocating that joint plus his shoulder hit hard against the pavement. He however continued running, finishing last among the 57 competitors who completed the race (75 had started). The winner of the marathon, Mamo Wolde of Ethiopia, finished in 2:20:26. Akhwari finished in 3:25:27, when there were only a few thousand people left in the stadium, and the sun had set.  A television crew was sent out from the medal ceremony when word was received that there was one more runner about to finish.

As he finally crossed the finish line a cheer came from the small crowd. When interviewed later and asked why he continued running, he said, "My country did not send me 5,000 miles to start the race; they sent me 5,000 miles to finish the race."

Athletic career
Akhwari competed for many years before and after the 1968 Olympics. He finished first in the African Marathon Championships before the Olympics.  He finished fifth in the marathon at the 1970 Commonwealth Games where he ran a 2:15:05 time.  The winner had run 2:09:28.  In those same Games he ran a 28:44 in the 10,000 meter race and was only about 30 seconds behind the leaders.  He ran marathons in the 2:20 range on a regular basis both before and after the 1968 Olympics.  He was a world class runner for most of the 1960s and 1970s.

Post-Athletic Career
Akhwari has lived for many years in his village with his wife and children. They are farmers and work very hard in the fields. Once in a while the world beckons him back. He was awarded a National Hero Medal of Honor in 1983. He lent his name to the John Stephen Akhwari Athletic Foundation, an organization which supports Tanzanian athletes training for the Olympic Games. He was invited to the 2000 Olympics in Sydney, Australia. He later appeared in Beijing as a goodwill ambassador in preparation for the 2008 Games. He was a torchbearer in Dar es Salaam, Tanzania on April 13, 2008, for the Olympic torch relay through his country.

References

External links
 Article on Akhwari at the Official Website of the Beijing 2008 Olympic Games

1938 births
Living people
People from Manyara Region
Tanzanian male marathon runners
Tanzanian male long-distance runners
Athletes (track and field) at the 1962 British Empire and Commonwealth Games
Athletes (track and field) at the 1968 Summer Olympics
Athletes (track and field) at the 1970 British Commonwealth Games
Olympic athletes of Tanzania
Commonwealth Games competitors for Tanganyika
Commonwealth Games competitors for Tanzania